Men's horizontal bar has been staged at every European Men's Artistic Gymnastics Championships since 1955.

Medalists

Medal table

References 

European Artistic Gymnastics Championships